Cody Fry is an American singer, songwriter, composer and producer based in Nashville.

Biography
Cody Fry is the son of orchestral composer Gary Fry. He graduated from New Trier High School in 2008 and then moved to Nashville to study voice at Belmont University.

Fry was one of 48 final contestants on the 14th season of American Idol.

In 2021, his song "I Hear a Symphony" went viral on TikTok. The same year, his cover of "Eleanor Rigby" was nominated for a Grammy in the category of "Best Arrangement, Instrumental and Vocals".

Discography

Albums
 audio:cinema (2012)
 Keswick (2014)
 Flying (2017)
 Christmas Music: The Complete Collection (2019)
 Pictures of Mountains (2021)
 Symphony Sessions (2021/2022)

Singles
 Live Captured Recordings (2014)
 From the Cold (Live) (2016)
 Christmas Music, Vol. 1 (2017)
 Vegas (2018)
 Christmas Music, Vol. 2 (2018)
 08.26.18 (2019)
 That Thing That You Do (2019)
 Eleanor Rigby (2022)
 I Hear a Symphony (2023)

Awards and nominations

References

External links

American male guitarists
American session musicians
21st-century American guitarists
21st-century American male musicians
Living people
American male songwriters
American male singers
1990 births